Carly Craig (born June 12, 1980) is an American actress.

Background
Born and raised in San Diego, California, Craig comes from a large Italian-Irish family that includes two professional baseball players: her father, Rocky Craig, a scout for the Seattle Mariners; and younger brother, Casey Craig. Her mother, Marz Moore (née Olson), is a flight attendant for American Airlines. She has one sister and two brothers, and is the step-sister of entertainer Mandy Moore and her brothers (Carly's mother remarried Mandy's father).

Career
Craig studied at The Stella Adler Academy and The Second City, where she later graduated. She met famed manager Bernie Brillstein while waiting tables and decided to put on a comedy show with her classmates. Brillstein came to that show, and soon after, signed her as a client. Director David Wain cast Craig in Role Models as the love interest for Seann William Scott. Other projects would include Mike Leigh's critically lauded live show Ecstasy, Neil LaBute's Bash, The Farrelly Brothers Hall Pass, The Three Stooges, and Dumb and Dumber To as young Fraida Felcher.  On television, she's recurred on Stephen Merchant's HBO series Hello Ladies, Ben Stiller's Burning Love, and ABC's American Housewife as Tara Summers.

Craig was listed as a "Vanities Girl" for the April 2011 edition of Vanity Fair along with Kristen Bell, Leslie Mann and Mila Kunis, and was also ranked No. 83 on the "Maxim Hot 100 List" in 2011. She has appeared in Esquire and appeared in Kevin Farley's film Paranormal Movie in 2013. In 2014, she appeared as a young Fraida Felcher in Dumb and Dumber To, and also starred as a single air flight attendant in the Adult Swim series Infomercials. In 2018, she co-created and starred in Sideswiped, a comedy TV series.

Filmography

References

External links
 

1980 births
Living people
American film actresses
American television actresses
21st-century American women